A by-election was held for the New South Wales Legislative Assembly electorate of Liverpool Plains on 16 August 1911 because of the resignation of Henry Horne because he disagreed with legislation introduced by the Labor Secretary for Lands Niels Nielsen.

The member for Mudgee Bill Dunn also resigned, and the Mudgee by-election was held on the same day.

Dates

Results

Henry Horne resigned.

Aftermath
With a margin of 3 votes and 91 informal votes, William Ashford challenged the result before the Elections and Qualifications Committee, which declared the election void. William Ashford comfortably won the subsequent by-election.

See also
 Electoral results for the district of Liverpool Plains
List of New South Wales state by-elections

Notes

References

1911 elections in Australia
New South Wales state by-elections
1910s in New South Wales